Arthur George Topham (19 February 1869 – 18 May 1931) was an English international footballer who played as a left half.

Early and personal life
Topham was born in Elson, near Ellesmere, as the youngest of six children. His brother Robert was also a footballer. He attended Oswestry School, followed by Keble College, Oxford, where he earned a Blue in 1890.

Career
Topham played club football for Casuals, Eastbourne and Chiswick Park, and also guested for Corinthian. He was a runner-up in the FA Amateur Cup in 1894.

He played for Eastbourne between 1894 and 1902, when he retired.

He earned one cap for England in 1894.

Later life and death
Topham later worked as a private tutor, dying on 18 May 1931 at the age of 62.

References

External links

1869 births
1931 deaths
English footballers
England international footballers
Casuals F.C. players
Eastbourne Town F.C. players
Corinthian F.C. players
People from Ellesmere, Shropshire
Association football wing halves